Sarah Amherst, Countess Amherst (later Sarah Windsor, Countess of Plymouth; 1762–1838), credited as Sarah Amherst, was a British naturalist and botanist who lived in India. She identified several species which were named after her, including a variety of pheasant (Chrysolophus amherstiae) and a flowering tree (Amherstia nobilis).

Marriages and issue
Her parents were Andrew Archer, 2nd Baron Archer, and Sarah West, daughter of James West. She was married to her first cousin Other Windsor, 5th Earl of Plymouth, from 1778 until his death in 1799. They had the following children:
 Other Archer Windsor, 6th Earl of Plymouth (1789–1833);
 Lady Maria Windsor (1790–1855), who married Arthur Hill, 3rd Marquess of Downshire;
 Harriet Windsor-Clive, 13th Baroness Windsor (1797–1869), who married the Hon. Robert Clive.

Her second husband was William Amherst, 1st Earl Amherst. Their children were:
Lady Sarah Elizabeth Pitt Amherst (1801–1876), who married Sir John Hay-Williams, 2nd Baronet;
 Hon. Jeffrey Amherst (1802–1826);
 William Pitt Amherst, 2nd Earl Amherst (1805–1886);
 Hon. Frederick Campbell Amherst (1807–1829).

References

1762 births
1838 deaths
British botanists
British countesses
British naturalists
British people in colonial India
18th-century British women scientists
Daughters of barons